The Post of Slovenia (PS) is a state-owned company responsible for postal service in Slovenia. The headquarters is located at Slomšek Square 10 (Slomškov trg 10) in Maribor. Boris Novak is the CEO of the Post of Slovenia.

External links 
 Official site

Communications in Slovenia
Slovenia
Logistics companies of Slovenia
Postal system of Slovenia
Philately of Slovenia
1995 establishments in Slovenia
Companies established in 1995
Companies based in Maribor